Girella nigricans, commonly known as the opaleye or rudderfish, is a species of sea chub found in the Eastern Pacific, from California to southern Baja California. A rarely documented isolated population also exists in the Gulf of California, which might be genetically different from the rest of the species. They feed primarily on algae, but will occasionally consume sessile invertebrates (including crustaceans, worms, and molluscs). They are considered commercially important game fish.

The body of Girella nigricans is laterally compressed and oval in shape. The snout is blunt and short, with a thick-lipped small mouth located at the front. The species is dentally polymorphic, with some juveniles transitioning from tricuspid teeth to simple teeth. The fins are all relatively short and rounded to blunt in shape. The dorsal fin is continuous and the tail fin has a straight margin. Adults are grey-green to olive green in color in life, with two to six lighter colored spots on the middle of the upper back. A white bar may be present between the eyes. The eyes are opalescent blue-green in color. Juveniles are bluish in color on the dorsal surface and silvery on the ventral surface.

References

External links
 

nigricans
Fish of the Gulf of California
Fish described in 1860